"The Story of My Life" is a song by Swedish punk rock band Millencolin from their second album Life on a Plate, released as a single on 20 September 1995 by Burning Heart Records. The CD single also includes "9 to 5" and "Dragster", which are B-sides from the album's recording sessions. These two songs were re-released on the 1999 compilation album The Melancholy Collection. An accompanying music video for "The Story of My Life" was also filmed and released.

Track listing
"The Story of My Life" - 2:32
"9 to 5" (originally performed by Dolly Parton) - 3:05
"Dragster" - 2:03

Personnel

Millencolin
Nikola Sarcevic - lead vocals, bass
Erik Ohlsson - guitar
Mathias Färm - guitar
Fredrik Larzon - drums

Charts

Weekly charts

Year-end charts

References

Millencolin songs
1995 singles
1995 songs
Burning Heart Records singles